"Love Me" is a sentimental song composed by Jerry Leiber and Mike Stoller and recorded and popularized by Elvis Presley in 1956.

Background
Conceived as a parody of country and western music, it was initially recorded by R&B duo, Willy & Ruth, in 1954 (Spark 105), garnering a review spotlight in Billboard on August 14. Willie Headen was the lead singer of a vocal group, the Honey Bears, and Ruth was the wife of another group member. That record was quickly followed the same year with cover versions by Georgia Gibbs, Connie Russell, Billy Eckstine, Kay Brown, the Four Escorts, the Billy Williams Quartet, the Woodside Sisters and the DeMarco Sisters, and in January 1955 by Jimmie Rodgers Snow. Most of these records were well reviewed in the trades, but none was a hit.

Elvis Presley recording
Elvis Presley recorded the song on September 1, 1956, for his second album, Elvis (RCA Victor, LPM-1382), issued on October 19. It was also released on the EP, Elvis Vol. 1 (RCA Victor, EPA-992). It climbed to the #2 position on the Billboard Top 100 in the United States, a first for a title not coming from single. "Love Me" also peaked at number seven on the R&B chart. "Love Me" was not released as a single to avoid confusion with Presley's "Love Me Tender". Presley sang "Love Me" on the October 28, 1956, Ed Sullivan Show. Elvis included this song in the 1968 NBC Network Comeback Special  and often performed it in concerts in the seventies, including his last tour in June 1977.

In Rolling Stone's 100 Greatest Singers Of All Time issue in 2008, Led Zeppelin's Robert Plant recalled singing the song with Elvis in 1974: 
When I met Elvis with Zeppelin, after one of his concerts in the early '70s, I sized him up. He wasn't quite as tall as me, but he had a singer's build, and he was driven. At that meeting, Jimmy Page joked with Elvis that we never soundchecked – but if we did, all I wanted to do was sing Elvis songs. Elvis thought that was funny and asked me, 'Which songs do you sing?' I told him I liked the ones with all the moods, like that great country song 'Love Me' – 'Treat me like a fool/Treat me mean and cruel/But love me.' So when we were leaving, after a most illuminating and funny 90 minutes with the guy, I was walking down the corridor. He swung 'round the door frame, looking quite pleased with himself, and started singing that song: 'Treat me like a fool.' I turned around and did Elvis right back at him. We stood there, singing to each other. What he did was he made it possible for me, as a singer, to become otherworldly.

References

Davis Daniel songs
Elvis Presley songs
Billy "Crash" Craddock songs
1954 singles
Songs written by Jerry Leiber and Mike Stoller
1950s ballads
Pop ballads